Julián Bourdeu (Bagnères-de-Bigorre, France, 1870 - Buenos Aires, Argentina, 1932) was one of the numerous people from southern France who emigrated to Rio de la Plata. Once established in Argentina, he became a distinguished resident of the city of Buenos Aires where he created or supported several cultural endeavours. He was also a journalist and a Police Commissary. 

Bourdeu arrived in Buenos Aires in 1888 and was the first Chief Accountant of the  Fábrica Nacional de Calzado (National Shoe Factory). The establishing of the factory in that year led to the creation of Villa Crespo (initially called "San Bernardo"), one of the pioneer towns in Buenos Aires. Bourdeu therefore became one of the pioneers in that zone. The following year Bourdeu was Justice of the Peace, and the founder or co-founder of many institutions, the newspaper"El Progreso" (1895), Biblioteca Popular de San Bernardo (San Bernardo Public Library, 1910, presently "Biblioteca Popular Alberdi") and the first director or president of many others. Prior to the 1904 presidential elections, Julian Bourdeu was elected as a member of the college that voted Manuel Quintana as President of the Republic and elected national senators for the capital, the Argentine electoral system at the time being indirect. 

In 1904, an act was passed in order to improve the relations between the law enforcement authorities and the community and, as a consequence, a number of notable citizens were asked to join the ranks of the Police. Bourdeu was appointed Commissary of the Capital Police (in the city of Buenos Aires), a force that, in 1947, became the Policía Federal Argentina. Simultaneously with his police role he took significant and constant action in all areas related to community culture and development in many neighbourhoods of the city of Buenos Aires.

Julien Bourdeu died in Buenos Aires in February 1932.

References 
 El Barrio de Villa Crespo, del Pino, Diego A.; Cuadernos de Buenos Aires, N° XLIV; first edition, Municipalidad de la Ciudad de Buenos Aires, Buenos Aires, 1974.
 Historia de Villa Crespo - Pasado y presente del barrio. Dr. Francavilla, Cayetano; Author’s edition, Buenos Aires, 1978.
 Buenos Aires: cronología del barrio de Belgrano y sus alrededores, 1855-1910. Córdoba, Alberto Octavio; Association of Friends of the Sarmiento Historical  Museum (Asociación de Amigos del Museo Histórico Sarmiento), Buenos Aires, 1980.
 Archives of the Institute for Historical Studies of the Policía Federal Argentina.
 Services file of Julián Bourdeu, Policía de la Capital, Buenos Aires.
 Archive of the Junta Barrial y de Estudios Históricos de Villa Crespo, Buenos Aires.

External links 

 http://barriada.com.ar/VillaTalar/VillaTalar_1.htm
 http://biblioalberdi.webs.com

1870 births
1932 deaths
French emigrants to Argentina